Leonid Mikhailovich Shcherbakov (born 7 April 1927) is a retired Russian triple jumper who won a silver medal  at the 1952 Olympics. He broke the world record in 1953 and won the European title in 1950 and 1954. Domestically he won eight consecutive Soviet titles in 1949–56.

After retiring from competitions, Shcherbakov worked at the Russian State University of Physical Education, Sport, Youth and Tourism, and later coached triple jumpers in Algeria and Cuba. His trainees included Pedro Pérez. In 1987 he was named an IAAF top 10 performer of all time in the triple jump.

References

External links
 
 
 
 
 Biography 

1927 births
Possibly living people
People from Yaroslavl Oblast
Soviet male triple jumpers
Olympic silver medalists for the Soviet Union
Athletes (track and field) at the 1952 Summer Olympics
Athletes (track and field) at the 1956 Summer Olympics
Olympic athletes of the Soviet Union
Dynamo sports society athletes
World record setters in athletics (track and field)
European Athletics Championships medalists
Medalists at the 1952 Summer Olympics
Olympic silver medalists in athletics (track and field)